Keeping the Faith is a 2000 American romantic comedy film written by Stuart Blumberg, and starring Ben Stiller, Edward Norton (in his directorial debut), Jenna Elfman, Eli Wallach, and Anne Bancroft. This film was released by Touchstone Pictures and Spyglass Entertainment, in association with Triple Threat Talent, on April 14, 2000.

The film is dedicated to Norton's late mother, Robin. It had a budget of $29 million.

Plot
Father Brian Finn, dedicated to his calling as Catholic priest since childhood, shares the duties of his New York parish with the older Fr. Havel. Rabbi Jacob "Jake" Schram, best friends with Brian since they were children and the youngest rabbi at his synagogue, focuses on his work to the detriment of his private life, much to the chagrin of his mother, Ruth. 

The two men show a close bond even in their professions, planning to open a jointly-sponsored community center. The pair reminisce about their childhood friend Anna Reilly, meeting them in middle school after beating up a bully. The three were close friends until Anna's family moved to California and they ultimately lost touch.

Sixteen years later, Anna moves to New York for work and calls Jake and Brian out of the blue, rekindling their friendship. Anna and Jake begin sleeping together, but he is reluctant to become seriously involved as she is not Jewish, which could compromise his relationship with his congregation and his mother Ruth, who disowned her eldest son for marrying outside the faith. 

Between this conflict and their desire to spare Brian's feelings, the relationship is kept mostly secret. As the relationship continues, Jake remains unwilling to view the relationship as serious, despite Anna’s hints at her "taking a class." She is upset when they run into members of Jake's congregation while on a date, and Jake introduces her only as "my old friend Anna."

Brian is in private turmoil after also developing feelings for Anna, in conflict with his vows. He misinterprets Anna's words and actions – some of which are subtle signals to Jake – and even has an erotic dream about her. He seriously considers leaving the priesthood to pursue a romantic relationship with her. 

While the three have dinner with Ruth, she reveals to Anna that she knows about her and Jake's secret relationship. Jake and Brian walk in on the tearful moment, and Jake and Anna later argue over the religious issues complicating their romance and part ways. Anna calls Brian for comfort and he rushes to her, taking her tearful ramblings to be a confession of feelings for him. 

When Brian kisses Anna and confesses his love, she interrupts him, admitting she is in love with Jake and they have been seeing each other secretly for months. Embarrassed and rejected, he spends the night drinking on the streets. Still drunk the next day, Brian stumbles into Jake's temple and interrupts a post-bar mitzvah gathering, resulting in a confrontation that ends with the priest punching the rabbi.

As the Community Center's grand opening approaches, along with the end of Anna's East Coast assignment, Jake reconciles with Brian, as does Anna soon after. A discussion with Brian prompts Jake to go to Anna's office building, with Brian shouting encouragement as he runs down the street. Interrupting Anna's going-away party, Jake gets her attention from a window across the street, and calls to explain himself and offer to set things right. 

That evening, Jake and Anna surprise Brian in the middle of his karaoke number at the interfaith center. She greets Rabbi Lewis and mentions their meetings together, revealing that she had been taking classes to convert to Judaism. She tells him she hopes to pick it up again as she is now staying in New York, with Jake clearly thrilled. The film ends with the three friends happily posing for a photo together.

Cast

 Ben Stiller as Rabbi Jacob "Jake" Schram
 Samuel R. Goldberg as Teenage Jake Schram
 Edward Norton as Father Brian Kilkenney Finn
 Michael Charles Roman as Teenage Brian Finn
 Jenna Elfman as Anna Reilly
 Blythe Auffarth as Teenage Anna Reilly 
 Anne Bancroft as Ruth Schram
 Miloš Forman as Father Havel
 Eli Wallach as Rabbi Ben Lewis
 Holland Taylor as Bonnie Rose
 Lisa Edelstein as Ali Decker
 Rena Sofer as Rachel Rose
 Bodhi Elfman as Howard the Casanova, the businessman in the office across the road
 Brian George as Paulie Chopra, the Sikh Catholic Muslim with Jewish in-laws who owns an Irish Pub
 Ron Rifkin as Larry Friedman
 David Wain as Steve Posner
 Eugene Katz as Mohel (performing the circumcision in opening sequence where Jake faints)
 Ken Leung as Don, the electronics store owner
 Susie Essman as Ellen Friedman
 Catherine Lloyd Burns as Debbie
 Radio Man (Craig Castaldo) as himself
 Brian Anthony Wilson as T-Bone

Reception
Keeping the Faith received generally positive reviews. On Rotten Tomatoes, it holds a 69% rating, sampled from 117 film critics, with an average score of 6.23/10. The consensus states: "A dramedy featuring an unusual love triangle, Keeping the Faith is a perceptive look at how religion affects us in everyday life." Metacritic gives the film a score of 60 out of 100, based on reviews from 31 critics, indicating "mixed or average reviews". The New York Times film critic Elvis Mitchell said the film "struggles hard to be a modern romantic comedy about commitment and, well, faith, but it doesn't quite make the grade ... it is competent, but it seems driven to clear up complications as quickly as acne is dispatched in an infomercial." In Variety, Emanuel Levy praised Stiller's acting and said "Keeping the Faith is arguably the most accomplished" romantic movie in its era.

The film is recognized by American Film Institute in these lists:
 2002: AFI's 100 Years...100 Passions – Nominated

Box office
The film opened at #3 at the US box office, making $8,078,671 in its opening weekend, behind 28 Days and Rules of Engagement. The film eventually grossed $37,047,880 in North America and $22,897,303 in other territories, totaling $59,945,183 worldwide.

References

External links

 
 
 
 

2000 films
2000 romantic comedy films
American romantic comedy films
2000s English-language films
Films scored by Elmer Bernstein
Films directed by Edward Norton
Christian and Jewish interfaith dialogue
Films set in Manhattan
Films shot in New Jersey
Films shot in New York City
American interfaith romance films
Spyglass Entertainment films
Touchstone Pictures films
Films about Catholic priests
Films about Jews and Judaism
American buddy comedy films
2000s buddy comedy films
2000 directorial debut films
2000s American films